Panayioti "Panos" Armenakas (born 5 August 1998) is a professional soccer player who plays as a right winger for USL Championship club Loudoun United FC. Born in the United States, he has most recently represented Australia at youth level. 

Armenakas has played youth football for Sydney Olympic, Watford and Udinese. Originally, Armenakas represented Greece internationally before switching to Australia.

Early life
Armenakas was born in Newport Beach, California, United States, before moving to Sydney, New South Wales, Australia at a young age. He is of Greek descent.

Club career

Youth
Armenakas started his youth career playing for Sydney Olympic, after being scouted in a park by ex-Socceroo Jim Patikas. At the age of six, he was invited to spend three weeks training with FC Barcelona's elite juniors squad. While in Europe, he also spent time with Bolton Wanderers. Armenakas trained with the Milan Soccer School in Sydney under Andrea Icardi and Misha Radovic, before trialing with A.C. Milan in early 2010. In late 2010, he moved to Europe, initially joining Brescia before signing with Watford's Youth Academy.

Udinese
After spending two years with Watford, Armenakas signed a three-year deal with Udinese. By signing with the Italian club, Panos became the youngest Australian ever to sign a professional contract in any of the top five leagues in Europe. In November 2015, Armenakas signed a contract extension, keeping him at Udinese until 2018. He was released at the end of the 2017-18 season having made no appearances for the senior team and only featuring in one matchday squad.

Loan to Tubize
In July 2017, Armenakas joined Tubize in the Belgian First Division B on a one-year loan to have a chance at first team football. He was mostly an unused substitute during his time in Belgium, making six appearances.

Panathinaikos
After a trial period of three weeks Armenakas signed a -year contract with the Greek club at the beginning of January 2019. He left the Greens in January 2020 after only three appearances.

Return to Belgium
Armenakas joined Roeselare in September 2020 but the club collapsed just ten days later. After this he trained for eight weeks with Zulte Waregem, before signing a contract until the end of the season in November, with an option for a further year. He scored twice in ten games before leaving the club at the end of the season.

Vendsyssel FF
On 7 August 2021, Armenakas joined Danish 1st Division club Vendsyssel FF, signing a deal until June 2024.

International career
He has triple nationality and he is eligible to play for Greece, the United States and Australia. 

Armenakas initially represented Greece at under-17 level, playing in two friendly matches against Turkey in August 2014.

In late 2014, Armenakas accepted a call up to the Australian under-17 squad to play in the 2014 Nike International Friendlies tournament in the United States, where he made his debut in a loss to Brazil in November 2014. In October 2015, he was selected in Australia's 21-man squad for the 2015 FIFA U-17 World Cup in Chile. During this time, he was also selected by The Guardian as one of the fifty best young talents in world football.

He progressed onto the under-23 national team, where he was selected for friendly games on multiple occasions but was not included for the final squads for the 2018 AFC U-23 Championship, 2020 AFC U-23 Championship or the 2020 Summer Olympics.

Career statistics

References

External links
 
 

1998 births
Living people
Sportspeople from Newport Beach, California
Australian soccer players
Australian expatriate soccer players
Australia youth international soccer players
Greek footballers
Greek expatriate footballers
Greece youth international footballers
American soccer players
Greek emigrants to Australia
American people of Greek descent
American emigrants to Australia
Association football midfielders
Sydney Olympic FC players
Brescia Calcio players
Watford F.C. players
Udinese Calcio players
A.F.C. Tubize players
Panathinaikos F.C. players
K.S.V. Roeselare players
S.V. Zulte Waregem players
Vendsyssel FF players
Challenger Pro League players
Super League Greece players
Belgian Pro League players
Danish 1st Division players
Greek expatriate sportspeople in England
Greek expatriate sportspeople in Italy
Greek expatriate sportspeople in Belgium
Greek expatriate sportspeople in Denmark
Australian expatriate sportspeople in England
Australian expatriate sportspeople in Italy
Australian expatriate sportspeople in Belgium
Australian expatriate sportspeople in Denmark
Expatriate footballers in England
Expatriate footballers in Italy
Expatriate footballers in Belgium
Expatriate men's footballers in Denmark
Australian people of Greek descent